The 2012 Purbeck District Council election to the Purbeck District Council in Dorset took place on Thursday 3 May 2012.

Election result

Ward results

References

2012 English local elections
2012
2010s in Dorset